The municipal government of King, Ontario consists of the mayor and six councillors who are elected to office during the municipal elections in Ontario or who are acclaimed to office because their candidacy is unopposed. It also includes civic staff responsible for the operational affairs of the township.

Wards

A ward system was proposed by William Hodgson during a speech he delivered at the township's electoral nomination meeting on 20 November 1961.

The municipality is subdivided into six geopolitical wards. Ward 1 encompasses the region east of Keele Street and west of Bathurst Street, from the township's southern boundary to 19th Sideroad in the north. This includes the eastern portion of King City, and the communities of Eversley, Snowball, and Temperanceville. Ward 2 extends from Highway 400 in the east to 10th concession in the west, from the township's southern boundary to 15th sideroad in the north. It includes the communities of King Creek, Laskay, Nobleton, and Strange. Ward 3 covers all the western portion of the township, from its western border to the 10th concession, and also all the area east of Highway 400 that lies north of the 15th Sideroad and south of the 18th Sideroad. The communities of Hammertown, Happy Valley, Holly Park, Linton, and New Scotland are located in ward 3.

Ward 4 consists of the area east of the 10th concession and west of Highway 400, north of the 18th sideroad, and south the northern boundary of the township at its western end and of Highway 9 at its eastern end. It includes the communities of Lloydtown, Pottageville, and Schomberg. Ward 5 extends from the township's southern boundary to 19th Sideroad in the north, between Highway 400 in the west and Keele Street in the east. The western portion of King City and the communities of Kettleby and Kinghorn are located in ward 5. The northeastern portion of the township, north of Highway 9 west of Highway 400, and north of the 19th Sideroad east of Highway 400, is in ward 6. It includes the communities of Ansnorveldt and Glenville.

Council
The council of the township includes the mayor and six councillors. The mayor is Steve Pelligrini, and the councillors are Jordan Cescolini (ward 1), David Boyd (ward 2), Jakob Schneider (ward 3), Bill Cober (ward 4), Debbie Schaefer (ward 5), and Avia Eek (ward 6).

Upon election, the mayor automatically becomes a councillor for York Regional Council, its only representative from King. This automatic representation of an elected individual to a second council is known as a double direct election.

Elections
During municipal elections, electors cast ballots for candidate councillors and school board trustees representing their ward. Each year, the municipal government sets aside approximately $30,000 of revenues to allocate toward the cost of the municipal election.

In the 1800s, many elections were resolved by acclamation as candidates often had no opposition; the Newmarket Era issue of 16 December 1887 stated that "King Township usually elects by acclamation" when discussing the impending election of January 1888 for which the reeve and 3rd deputy reeve were acclaimed.

In 1873, a third deputy reeve was added to King Council as a result of a population increase, and specifically the number of properties on the tax roll. In the December 1962 municipal election, the electorate voted in favour of increasing councillor terms from one year to two years.

The creation of the Regional Municipality of York and the reorganization of its constituent municipalities in 1971 resulted in the abolition of the positions of reeve and deputy reeve, and created the position of mayor.

In 1910, the township electorate rejected a local option, voting in favour of the measure 741–515 but short of attaining the required 60% overall vote to pass the measure by 13 votes. In 1912, there was a 126–34 vote in favour of a local option.

In the late 1930s, the council passed an election bylaw under which terms councillors elected or acclaimed to office would hold that office for two years. It first applied to the December 1940 election, for which no candidate was opposed and all were elected by acclamation.

Councillors

Voter turnout was 45% for the 2010 election and 33% for the 2014 election.

For the 2014 municipal elections, the mayor Steve Pellegrini and ward 1 councillor Cleve Mortelliti are acclaimed.

School board trustees
School board trustees are elected for four school boards operating in King. An elector may cast a ballot for a candidate trustee for one of those school boards, determined by the "Direction of School Support" associated with the elector's municipal property tax statement per Section 6 of the provincial Assessment Act. Public school trustees represent the York Region District School Board (YRDSB) or the French immersion board Conseil Scolaire Viamonde (CSV). Separate public school trustees represent the York Catholic District School Board (YCDSB) or the French immersion Conseil scolaire de district catholique Centre-Sud (CSDCCS).

The elected trustee of the YRDSB represents all wards in King and Aurora. The schools represented in King by this trustee are King City Secondary School, King City Public School, Kettleby Public School, Nobleton Public School, and Schomberg Public School.

The elected trustee of the YCDSB represents all wards in King, Aurora, and Whitchurch–Stouffville. The schools represented in King by this trustee are Holy Name Catholic Elementary School in King City, St. Mary Catholic Elementary School in Nobleton, and St. Patrick Catholic Elementary School in Schomberg.

Gord Kerr was elected as the trustee for the YRDSB in 2010. He resigned from office in 2012, and was replaced by Peter Adams-Luchowki.

Municipal office
In 1952, the township's municipal office was located in Nobleton. In 1956, council purchased land west of Highway 400 on which to construct a municipal office building.

The Township offices were moved to the King City Plaza, a strip mall purchased by the municipal government in the 1990s which also has several business tenants. In 2013, the township purchased the disused former Holy Name Catholic Elementary School building and adjacent  of land from the York Catholic District School Board for $2.95 million. In 2016, township planning staff announced that the  school building would be redesigned for use as office space for the township, for community and non-profit groups, and to house a satellite office for the York Regional Police.

The school building was demolished during mid 2016. Of that cost, $13.1 million was for construction, and the remainder for associated charges, including moving municipal staff from the previous offices. It includes a  public-use gymnasium. The capital project was partially financed by selling the strip mall for $10.75 million, with the remainder obtained from a $4 million debenture, $4.5 million from the infrastructure reserve fund, $1.5 million from development charges, and a $1 million capital contribution from the Regional Municipality of York. The facility has a geothermal heat pump system, and charging stations for electric vehicles. The former strip mall was demolished in January 2022.

In December 2018, the new municipal building was opened for the inaugural session of a new council following the 2018 municipal elections. The preceding council had approved the $40,000 purchase of Steel Gorgeous, an iron horse sculpture created by Kendall McCulloch, for installation at the municipal office. The sculpture had been lent by the artist to Caledon Equestrian Park in Palgrave for the equestrian events during the 2015 Pan American Games.

Notes

References

External links
Government at the Township of King website
Mayor and council at the Township of King website

Politics of King, Ontario
King